Robert Maurice Brutinel (born March 18, 1958) is the chief justice of the Arizona Supreme Court. He was appointed to the court in 2010 by Governor Jan Brewer, through Arizona's merit selection system

Professional career
Brutinel is a graduate of the University of Arizona school of law.
After graduating law school Brutinel worked in private practice before being appointed a superior court judge in Yavapai County in 1996. He served as the presiding judge from 2004 until his appointment to the Supreme Court in 2010. Brutinel was retained in an election in 2014, and 2020.

In 2019, Brutinel was elected by his fellow justices to a term as Chief Justice, replacing Justice Scott Bales.

References

External links
 

|-

1958 births
Living people
Place of birth missing (living people)
20th-century American lawyers
20th-century American judges
21st-century American judges
Chief Justices of the Arizona Supreme Court
Justices of the Arizona Supreme Court
University of Arizona alumni